The 2017 FC Shakhter Karagandy season is the 26th successive season that the club will play in the Kazakhstan Premier League, the highest tier of association football in Kazakhstan. Shakhter Karagandy will also be participating in the Kazakhstan Cup.

Season events
Shakhter Karagandy's away game against Aktobe on 22 April was postponed as Aktobes pitch at their stadium was not ready after an extended period of winter weather.

On 29 May, Aleksei Yeryomenko was fired as the club's manager, with Saulius Shirmyalisa being appointed as the club's manager on 2 June.

Squad

Transfers

Winter

In:

Out:

Summer

In:

Out:

Competitions

Kazakhstan Premier League

Results summary

Results by round

Results

League table

Kazakhstan Cup

Squad statistics

Appearances and goals

|-
|colspan="14"|Players away from Shakhter Karagandy on loan:
|-
|colspan="14"|Players who left Shakhter Karagandy during the season:

|}

Goal scorers

Disciplinary record

References

External links
Official Website

FC Shakhter Karagandy seasons
Shakhter Karagandy